Anemone berlandieri, commonly known as tenpetal thimbleweed or tenpetal anemone, is a rhizomatous perennial flowering plant in the buttercup family Ranunculaceae. It is native to much of the Southern United States, where it flowers in the late winter and spring, between February and April. The specific epithet berlandieri honors Jean-Louis Berlandier (1803–1851), a botanist who explored Texas and Mexico in the nineteenth century.

Distribution

Anemone berlandieri is native to much of the Southern United States, from Texas to Florida. It ranges as far north as Kansas, and as far south as northeast Mexico. There is also an isolated population in the southern Appalachian Mountains. It grows in sunny open areas, such as prairies and hillsides, and in wooded areas over a thin shale substrate.

References

berlandieri
Flora of the South-Central United States
Flora of the Southeastern United States
Flora of the North-Central United States